The 1986 Buffalo Bills season was the franchise's 17th season in the National Football League, and the 27th overall.

Although the Bills were only 2–6 at the midway point of the season, their games were much more competitive than in years past. (Only two of their losses in the first eight games were by more than a touchdown.) Still, after a 6-point Week Nine loss to Tampa Bay, the Bills fired coach Hank Bullough, and hired former Kansas City coach Marv Levy to replace him. (Though Levy was not on the Bills' coaching staff, he had served as a television analyst for the team during the 1986 preseason and was hired away from his executive role from the Montreal Alouettes because of that team's terminal financial situation.) Levy would win his first game with the Bills against Pittsburgh in Week Ten, and one more game against Kansas City in Week Thirteen, finishing with a 2–5 record in his first half-season as head coach.

Years later, Bills offensive tackle Will Wolford alleged that the team purposely lost the week 9 game to Tampa Bay in order to get Bullough fired.

The Bills ended their 22-game losing streak on the road by beating the Chiefs at Arrowhead Stadium, 17–14. Coincidentally, the Bills beat the Chiefs, 14–9, in the road game leading up to the losing streak in 1983.

Offseason
At the end of the 1985 season, the Bills' future was in serious jeopardy; two consecutive seasons in which the team had finished 2–14 had driven attendance at Rich Stadium to less than 30,000 fans per game. 1985 first overall draft pick Bruce Smith, while he had a respectable rookie season, underperformed compared to expectations and was admittedly not putting his whole heart into the game of football. Quarterback Jim Kelly, whom the team had drafted in the first round of the 1983 draft as their franchise quarterback of the future, still refused to play in Buffalo and was prepared to play the 1986 season as a member of the New Jersey Generals of the United States Football League; the Generals' soon-to-be-displaced quarterback, Doug Flutie, who would become a Bill much later in his career, also rejected the team's overtures and stayed in the USFL. These rejections forced the Bills to sign Art Schlichter, a notorious compulsive gambler who had flamed out with the Indianapolis Colts, as their backup plan; Schlichter was to compete with Frank Reich, whom the Bills drafted the previous year, for the starting position.

Buffalo's fortunes underwent a drastic improvement before the season. On July 29, 1986, the USFL received only a nominal judgment in its antitrust lawsuit against the NFL, leaving the league without much-needed capital and forcing the end of its operations. With no other options, Kelly then signed with the Bills amid much fanfare, and Schlichter was released. The signing (along with those of fellow USFL refugees Ray Bentley and Kent Hull) doubled the team's home attendance.

NFL draft

University of Iowa running back Ronnie Harmon played for the Bills for four seasons. Vanderbilt's Will Wolford played offensive tackle for the Bills for seven years, and was voted to the Pro Bowl in 1990 and 1992. Linebacker Mark Pike played his entire 13-year career with the Bills, mostly as a special teams star; he is the NFL's all-time leader in tackles on special teams, with 283. Tight end Butch Rolle played for the Bills for 6 years, and at one point had a streak of ten consecutive receptions for touchdowns.

Personnel

Staff

Roster

Regular season

Transactions
Steve Tasker was claimed off waivers by the Buffalo Bills on November 8, 1986.

Schedule

Game summaries

Week 1 vs. Jets

Three years after being drafted by the Bills, Jim Kelly debuted in front of the home crowd with 292 yards passing and three touchdowns but it was not enough to overcome the divisional rival Jets.

Week 2 at Bengals

Week 3

Week 4

Week 5

Week 6

Week 7

Week 8

Week 9

Week 10

    
    
    
    
    

 Marv Levy first game as Buffalo Bills head coach.
 First Buffalo head coach to win coaching debut

Week 11

Week 12

Week 13

Week 14

Week 15

Week 16

Standings

Notes

References

External links
 1986 Buffalo Bills at Pro-Football-Reference.com

Buffalo Bills seasons
Buffalo Bills
Buff